Melanotaenia is a genus of rainbowfish from Australia, Indonesia (West Papua), New Guinea, and nearby smaller islands.

Species
There are currently 86 recognized species in this genus:
 Melanotaenia affinis (M. C. W. Weber, 1908) (New Guinea rainbowfish)
 Melanotaenia ajamaruensis G. R. Allen & N. J. Cross, 1980 (Ajamaru rainbowfish)
 Melanotaenia albimarginata G. R. Allen, Hadiaty, Unmack & Erdmann, 2015 (White-tip rainbowfish) 
 Melanotaenia ammeri G. R. Allen, Unmack & Hadiaty, 2008 (Ammer's rainbowfish)
 Melanotaenia angfa G. R. Allen, 1990 (Yakati rainbowfish)
 Melanotaenia arfakensis G. R. Allen, 1990 (Arfak rainbowfish)
 Melanotaenia arguni Kadarusman, Hadiaty & Pouyaud, 2012 (Arguni rainbowfish) 
 Melanotaenia aruensis G. R. Allen, Hadiaty, Unmack & Erdmann, 2015 (Aru rainbowfish) 
 Melanotaenia australis (Castelnau, 1875) (Western rainbowfish)
 Melanotaenia batanta G. R. Allen & Renyaan, 1998 (Batanta rainbowfish)
 Melanotaenia boesemani G. R. Allen & N. J. Cross, 1980 (Boeseman's rainbowfish)
 Melanotaenia bowmani G. R. Allen, Unmack & Hadiaty, 2016 (Bowman's rainbowfish) 
 Melanotaenia caerulea G. R. Allen, 1996 (Blue rainbowfish)
 Melanotaenia catherinae (de Beaufort, 1910) (Waigeo rainbowfish)
 Melanotaenia corona G. R. Allen, 1982 (Corona rainbowfish)
 Melanotaenia duboulayi (Castelnau, 1878) (Crimson-spotted rainbowfish)
 Melanotaenia dumasi M. C. W. Weber, 1907 (Omba rainbowfish) 
 Melanotaenia eachamensis G. R. Allen & N. J. Cross, 1982 (Lake Eacham rainbowfish)
 Melanotaenia ericrobertsi G. R. Allen, Unmack & Hadiaty, 2014 (Suswa rainbowfish) 
 Melanotaenia etnaensis G. R. Allen, Unmack & Hadiaty, 2016 (Etna Bay rainbowfish) 
 Melanotaenia exquisita G. R. Allen, 1978 (Exquisite rainbowfish)
 Melanotaenia fasinensis Kadarusman, Sudarto, Paradis & Pouyaud, 2010 (Fasin rainbowfish) 
 Melanotaenia flavipinnis G. R. Allen, Hadiaty & Unmack, 2014 (Misool yellowfin rainbowfish) 
 Melanotaenia fluviatilis (Castelnau, 1878) (Murray River rainbowfish)
 Melanotaenia fredericki (Fowler, 1939) (Sorong rainbowfish)
 Melanotaenia garylangei J. A. Graf, Herder & Hadiaty, 2015 (Gary Lange's rainbowfish) 
 Melanotaenia goldiei (W. J. Macleay, 1883) (Goldie River rainbowfish)
 Melanotaenia gracilis G. R. Allen, 1978 (Slender rainbowfish)
 Melanotaenia grunwaldi G. R. Allen, Unmack & Hadiaty, 2016 (Grunwald's rainbowfish) 
 Melanotaenia herbertaxelrodi G. R. Allen, 1980 (Lake Tebera rainbowfish)
 Melanotaenia irianjaya G. R. Allen, 1985 (Irian Jaya rainbowfish)
 Melanotaenia iris G. R. Allen, 1987 (Strickland rainbowfish)
 Melanotaenia japenensis G. R. Allen & N. J. Cross, 1980 (Japen rainbowfish)
 Melanotaenia kamaka G. R. Allen & Renyaan, 1996 (Kamaka rainbowfish)
 Melanotaenia klasioensis Kadarusman, Hadiaty & Pouyaud, 2015 (Klasio Creek rainbowfish) 
 Melanotaenia kokasensis G. R. Allen, Unmack & Hadiaty, 2008 (Kokas rainbowfish)
 Melanotaenia kolaensis G. R. Allen, Hadiaty, Unmack & Erdmann, 2015 (Kola rainbowfish) 
 Melanotaenia lacunosa G. R. Allen, Unmack & Hadiaty, 2016 (Mbuta rainbowfish) 
 Melanotaenia lacustris Munro, 1964 (Lake Kutubu rainbowfish)
 Melanotaenia lakamora G. R. Allen & Renyaan, 1996 (Lakamora rainbowfish)
 Melanotaenia laticlavia G. R. Allen, Unmack & Hadiaty, 2014 (Aifuf rainbowfish) 
 Melanotaenia longispina Kadarusman, Avarre & Pouyaud, 2015 (Long-spine rainbowfish)  
 Melanotaenia maccullochi J. D. Ogilby, 1915 (McCulloch's rainbowfish)
 Melanotaenia mairasi G. R. Allen & Hadiaty, 2011 (Lake Furnusu rainbowfish)
 Melanotaenia mamahensis G. R. Allen, Unmack & Hadiaty, 2016 (Mamah rainbowfish) 
 Melanotaenia manibuii Kadarusman, Slembrouck & Pouyaud, 2015 (Manibui rainbowfish)  
 Melanotaenia maylandi G. R. Allen, 1982 (Mayland's rainbowfish)
 Melanotaenia misoolensis G. R. Allen, 1982 (Misool rainbowfish)
 Melanotaenia monticola G. R. Allen, 1980 (Mountain rainbowfish)
 Melanotaenia mubiensis G. R. Allen, 1996 (Mubi rainbowfish)
 Melanotaenia multiradiata G. R. Allen, Unmack & Hadiaty, 2014 (Moswaren rainbowfish) 
 Melanotaenia naramasae Kadarusman, Nugraha & Pouyaud, 2015 (Naramasa rainbowfish)  
 Melanotaenia nigrans (J. Richardson, 1843) (Black-banded rainbowfish)
 Melanotaenia ogilbyi M. C. W. Weber, 1910 (Ogilby's rainbowfish)
 Melanotaenia oktediensis G. R. Allen & N. J. Cross, 1980 (Oktedi rainbowfish)
 Melanotaenia papuae G. R. Allen, 1981 (Papuan rainbowfish)
 Melanotaenia parkinsoni G. R. Allen, 1980 (Parkinson's rainbowfish)
 Melanotaenia parva G. R. Allen, 1990 (Lake Kurumoi rainbowfish)
 Melanotaenia patoti M. C. W. Weber, 1907 (Patoti's rainbowfish) 
 Melanotaenia picta G. R. Allen, Hadiaty, Unmack & Erdmann, 2015 (Painted rainbowfish) 
 Melanotaenia pierucciae G. R. Allen & Renyaan, 1996 (Pierucci's rainbowfish)
 Melanotaenia pimaensis G. R. Allen, 1980 (Pima River rainbowfish)
 Melanotaenia praecox (M. C. W. Weber & de Beaufort, 1922) (Neon rainbowfish)
 Melanotaenia pygmaea G. R. Allen, 1978 (Pygmy rainbowfish)
 Melanotaenia rubripinnis G. R. Allen & Renyaan, 1998 (Red-finned rainbowfish)
 Melanotaenia rubrivittata G. R. Allen, Unmack & Hadiaty, 2015 (Laser-red rainbowfish) 
 Melanotaenia rubrostriata (E. P. Ramsay & J. D. Ogilby, 1886) (Red-striped rainbowfish)
 Melanotaenia rumberponensis Kadarusman, Ogistira & Pouyaud, 2015 (Rumberpon rainbowfish)  
 Melanotaenia sahulensis Hammer, Allen, Martin, Adams & Unmack, 2019 (Sahul rainbowfish)
 Melanotaenia salawati Kadarusman, Sudarto, Slembrouck & Pouyaud, 2011 (Salawati rainbowfish)
 Melanotaenia sembrae Kadarusman, O. Carman & Pouyaud, 2015 (Sembra rainbowfish)   
 Melanotaenia senckenbergianus M. C. W. Weber, 1911 (Senckenberg rainbowfish) 
 Melanotaenia sexlineata (Munro, 1964) (Fly River rainbowfish)
 Melanotaenia sikuensis Kadarusman, Sudarto & Pouyaud, 2015 (Siku Creek rainbowfish)  
 Melanotaenia sneideri G. R. Allen & Hadiaty, 2013 (Kumawa rainbowfish) 
 Melanotaenia solata W. R. Taylor, 1964 (Northern rainbowfish)
 Melanotaenia splendida (W. K. H. Peters, 1866)
 M. s. inornata (Castelnau, 1875) (Chequered rainbowfish)
 M. s. splendida (W. K. H. Peters, 1866) (Eastern rainbowfish)
 M. s. tatei (Zietz, 1896) (Desert rainbowfish)
 Melanotaenia susii Kadarusman, Hubert & Pouyaud, 2015 (Susi Creek rainbowfish)  
 Melanotaenia sylvatica G. R. Allen, 1997 (Forest rainbowfish)
 Melanotaenia synergos G. R. Allen & Unmack, 2008 (Batanta Island rainbowfish) 
 Melanotaenia trifasciata (Rendahl, 1922) (Regal rainbowfish)
 Melanotaenia urisa Kadarusman, Setia Wibawa & Pouyaud, 2012 (Urisa rainbowfish) 
 Melanotaenia utcheensis McGuigen, 2001 (Utchee Creek rainbowfish)
 Melanotaenia vanheurni (M. C. W. Weber & de Beaufort, 1922) (Van Heurn's rainbowfish)
 Melanotaenia veoliae Kadarusman, D. Caruso & Pouyaud, 2012 (Veolia rainbowfish) 
 Melanotaenia wanoma Kadarusman, Ségura & Pouyaud, 2012 (Wanoma rainbowfish) 
 Melanotaenia wisloni Hammer, Allen, Martin, Adams & Unmack, 2019 (little rainbowfish)
 Melanotaenia wokamensis G. R. Allen, Hadiaty, Unmack & Erdmann, 2015 (Wokam rainbowfish)

Undescribed species
 Melanotaenia sp. (Running River rainbowfish)

References

 
Melanotaeniinae
Taxonomy articles created by Polbot